{{DISPLAYTITLE:C2H3ClO}}
The molecular formula C2H3ClO (molar mass: 78.50 g/mol, exact mass: 77.9872 u) may refer to:

 Acetyl chloride
 Chloroacetaldehyde